Renato Accorinti (born 30 March 1954, in Messina) is an Italian politician and activist.

Non-violent activist, pacifist and environmentalist involved in the social struggles against the Mafia in Sicily and corruption, he ran for Mayor of Messina as an independent at the 2013 municipal elections. He was elected and took office on 25 June 2013.

He also served as the first Metropolitan mayor of Messina from June 2016 to June 2018.

See also
2013 Italian local elections
List of mayors of Messina

References

External links
 

1954 births
Living people
Mayors of Messina
Italian activists